Anthony J. Morris (born December 1, 1986) is an American former professional baseball pitcher. He played in Major League Baseball (MLB) for the Cincinnati Reds.

Career
Morris attended Humble High School in Humble, Texas. Undrafted out of high school, Morris attended Kansas State University and played college baseball for the Kansas State Wildcats for three years (2007-2009). He was the 2009 Big 12 Conference Pitcher of the year. Morris was drafted by the Washington Nationals in the 4th round of the 2009 MLB draft.

Morris played in the Nationals organization in 2009 and 2010, appearing for the Gulf Coast Nationals, Hagerstown Suns, and Potomac Nationals.

On January 17, 2011, the Washington Nationals traded Morris, Michael Burgess, and Graham Hicks to the Chicago Cubs in exchange for Tom Gorzelanny. Morris missed the 2011 season due to an elbow injury that required surgery. In 2012 he played for the Daytona Cubs, and in 2013 he played for the Tennessee Smokies.

Morris was selected by the Pittsburgh Pirates in the minor league portion of the 2013 Rule 5 draft. He split the 2014 season between the GCL Pirates, Bradenton Marauders, Altoona Curve, and Indianapolis Indians. He spent the 2015 season with Indianapolis.

Morris signed a minor league contract with the Cincinnati Reds prior to the 2016 season. Morris split the 2016 season between the Louisville Bats and the Reds. He made his MLB debut on May 24, 2016. He elected free agency following the 2016 season.

Morris played for the Italy national baseball team in the 2017 World Baseball Classic.

See also
Rule 5 draft results

References

External links

1986 births
Living people
Baseball players from Houston
Major League Baseball pitchers
Cincinnati Reds players
Kansas State Wildcats baseball players
Gulf Coast Nationals players
Hagerstown Suns players
Potomac Nationals players
Daytona Cubs players
Tennessee Smokies players
Gulf Coast Pirates players
Altoona Curve players
Indianapolis Indians players
Bradenton Marauders players
Louisville Bats players
Navegantes del Magallanes players
American expatriate baseball players in Venezuela
2017 World Baseball Classic players
All-American college baseball players